Final standings of the Hungarian League 1970 Spring season

Group stage

Group A

Results

Group B

Results

Play-off matches
The teams that finished on the same place played against each other and the results determined their final position.

Final

Other results

Final standings
The final standings of the 1970 Spring Championship, after the play-off matches:

No teams were relegated

The winner of each group received 8 points, whilst the remaining teams got 7-1 points according to their standing. These points were added to the final table of 1970-1971 championship.

Statistical leaders

Top goalscorers

External links
 IFFHS link

Nemzeti Bajnokság I seasons
1969–70 in Hungarian football
Hun